Banca Popolare  (Popular Bank) or Banca del Popolo (People's Bank)  may refer to several Italian banks:

Current banks
 Südtiroler Volksbank – Banca Popolare dell'Alto Adige, a South Tyrol bank
 Banca Popolare di Bari, an Italian bank
 Banca Popolare di Cividale, an Italian bank
 Banca Popolare dell'Emilia Romagna, former name of BPER Banca, an Italian listed company
 Banca Popolare FriulAdria, a subsidiary of Crédit Agricole Italia
 Banca Popolare del Frusinate, an Italian bank
 Banca Popolare del Lazio, an Italian bank
 Banca Popolare Province Molisane, an Italian bank; see Banca Caripe
 Banca Popolare di Milano, a subsidiary of Banco BPM, former listed company
 Banca Popolare di Puglia e Basilicata, an Italian bank
 Banca Popolare Pugliese, an Italian bank
 Banca Popolare di Sondrio, an Italian listed company
 Banca Popolare di Spoleto, a subsidiary of Banco di Desio e della Brianza

Brands
 Banca Popolare di Lodi, a brand of Banco BPM, former incorporated company
 Banca Popolare di Novara, a brand of Banco BPM, former incorporated company
 Banca Popolare di Verona, a brand of Banco BPM, former incorporated company

Defunct banks
 Banca Popolare dell'Adriatico, a predecessor of Banca dell'Adriatico, a subsidiary of Intesa Sanpaolo
 Banca Popolare dell'Alto Lazio, a predecessor of Banca Popolare dell'Etruria e del Lazio
 Banca Popolare di Ancona, a defunct subsidiary of UBI Banca
 Banca Popolare di Bergamo, a defunct subsidiary of UBI Banca
 Banca Popolare di Brescia, a predecessor of Bipop Carire
 Banca Popolare Commercio e Industria, a defunct subsidiary of UBI Banca
 Banca Popolare dell'Etruria e del Lazio, a predecessor of Nuova Banca dell'Etruria e del Lazio
 Banca Popolare dell'Etruria, a predecessor of Banca Popolare dell'Etruria e del Lazio
 Banca Popolare di Lanciano e Sulmona, a defunct subsidiary of Banca Popolare dell'Emilia Romagna
 Banca Popolare di Lecco, a defunct subsidiary of Deutsche Bank
 Banca Mutua Popolare di Mantova, a predecessor of Banca Agricola Mantovana
 Banca Popolare di Mantova, a defunct subsidiary of Banca Popolare di Milano
 Banca Popolare di Modena, a predecessor of Banca Popolare dell'Emilia Romagna
 Banca Popolare di Montebelluna, a predecessor of Veneto Banca
 Banca Popolare del Molise, a defunct subsidiary of Rolo Banca
 Banca Popolare di Rieti, a defunct subsidiary of UniCredit

 Banca Popolare Veneta, a predecessor of Banca Antonveneta
 Banca Popolare di Vicenza, a defunct bank

See also
 Banco Popolare
 Banca di Credito Popolare di Torre del Greco
 Banca Agricola Popolare di Ragusa
 Credito Valtellinese, governed by the same banking law as other Banca Popolare
 UBI Banca